Pjesme iz Bosne (Songs from Bosnia) is the debut release by Bosnian folk singer Zehra Deović. It was released 11 December 1962 and re-released with an alternate cover in 1964 through the label Jugoton.

Track listing

Personnel

Instruments
Ismet Alajbegović – accordion
Jovica Petković – accordion

Crew
Jozo Ćetković – photography

References

1962 EPs
Zehra Deović albums
Jugoton EPs